(also written 2010 XC15) is an Aten near-Earth asteroid and potentially hazardous object that spends most of its time inside of the orbit of Earth. It has an observation arc of 10 years and an Uncertainty Parameter of 1. It was discovered on 5 December 2010 by the Catalina Sky Survey at an apparent magnitude of 17.5 using a  Schmidt.

In November 2011 with an observation arc of 40 days, the JPL Small-Body Database showed that the uncertainty region of the asteroid during the 1976 close approach could result in a pass anywhere from 0.001 AU to 0.018 AU from Earth. During the 1976 close approach the asteroid reached about apparent magnitude 14.

The asteroid will pass  from Earth on 27 December 2022, allowing a refinement to the known trajectory.

The asteroid , with a much larger observation arc, is known to have passed  from Earth on 11 April 1971.

References

External links 
 
 
 

Discoveries by the Catalina Sky Survey
Minor planet object articles (unnumbered)

20221227
20101205